George I. Eacker ( 1774 – January 4, 1804) was a New York lawyer. He is best known for having fatally shot Philip Hamilton, the eldest son of Alexander Hamilton and Elizabeth Schuyler Hamilton, in a duel on November 23, 1801, in  Weehawken, New Jersey.

Early life and education 
Eacker was born in Palatine, New York. He was the son of Jacob Eacker, who fought in the American Revolution and served as a county judge and a member of the New York State Assembly, and Anna Margaret Finck, daughter of Andreas Finck. He had one younger brother, Jacob I., and four sisters.

He attended a preparatory school in Schenectady, New York, and graduated from Columbia College in 1793. He then studied law under Henry Brockholst Livingston, a future Associate Justice of the Supreme Court of the United States.

Career 
Eacker was admitted to the New York bar at 21. He soon built his practice in Manhattan into a lucrative business, which allowed him to take a house on Wall Street and to employ a married couple as his valet and housekeeper. He gained popularity in New York City's well-to-do social circles as a lawyer, Freemason, cavalry captain, and fire brigade inspector.

For an unknown offense in 1798, which the historian Eric Henry Monkkonen interprets as an earlier duel or conflict, Eacker appeared in court and paid a recognizance, likely as a bond for good behavior.

In 1801, Eacker was appointed as a master in the New York Court of Chancery, which was the highest court in the state.

Duels with Price and Philip Hamilton 

Eacker was selected in 1801 to deliver the Fourth of July oration at an Independence Day celebration held in New York City by a brigade of the New York State Militia, the Tammany Society, and two of the city's labor organizations: the Mechanics' Society and Coopers' Society. The Tammany Society, better known as Tammany Hall, was a Democratic-Republican Party political organization that Aaron Burr had built into a political machine. In politics, Eacker was known to be aligned with Burr.

According to a supporter, the speech that Eacker delivered was commended by "nearly everybody" except for partisans who were "blinded... to every virtue" by "party spirit, which at that time was very bitter." Some accounts questioned whether the speech was critical of Alexander Hamilton, as was later characterized. According to a 19th-century historian who relied on Eacker's younger brother as a source, the speech was entirely patriotic and did not name or allude to Hamilton.

On November 20, 1801, a Friday night, Eacker attended a play at the Park Theatre with his fiancée Harriet Livingston, a daughter of Walter Livingston and Cornelia Schuyler. Philip Hamilton, the eldest son of Alexander Hamilton, and Stephen Price approached or entered Eacker's box together and loudly ridiculed him. Eacker called them "damned rascals." In response to that insult, as was then common, both challenged Eacker to a duel.

Price faced the 27-year-old Eacker in a duel in Weehawken, New Jersey, on November 22. Four shots were exchanged, but neither party was injured.

At the same location on the following day, Eacker fatally shot the 19-year-old Hamilton in a second duel. Hamilton refused to raise his pistol to fire after he and Eacker had counted ten paces and faced each other. Hamilton followed his father's instructions to reserve his fire. Eacker, determined to fire second, did not shoot. After a minute, Eacker finally raised his pistol, and Hamilton did the same. Eacker shot and struck Philip above his right hip. The bullet went through his body and lodged in his left arm. In what may have been an involuntary spasm, Hamilton fired his pistol in the air.

In a letter to Rufus King, Robert Troup wrote of Alexander Hamilton, "Never did I see a man so completely overwhelmed with grief as Hamilton had been." Nevertheless, he was said to be civil and professional in his later relationship with Eacker. Hamilton would die in a duel with Aaron Burr only a few years later, on July 11, 1804, on the same dueling ground in Weehawken.

Death and legacy
Eacker died on January 4, 1804. His death was attributed to consumption, or tuberculosis. According to Eacker's brother, the prolonged illness began in January 1802 on a bitterly cold night when Eacker fought a raging fire with his brigade and contracted a severe cold that "settled upon his lungs" until his death.

His remains were interred at St. Paul's Chapel with military honors, and his funeral procession included members of the military, fire brigade, and the Howard Lodge of Freemasons.

Eacker and his fiancée never married. In January 1808, Harriet Livingston married the steamboat inventor Robert Fulton with whom she had four children.

In popular culture 
Eacker appears as a minor character in the 2015 Broadway musical Hamilton in which the musical number "Blow Us All Away" dramatizes his duel with Philip Hamilton. The role of Eacker originated on Broadway by a member of the show's ensemble, Ephraim M. Sykes, who also appears as Eacker on the original cast recording.

See also 
 List of people killed in duels

References 

American lawyers
1804 deaths
1774 births
American duellists
American Freemasons
Members of the New York State Assembly
American fire chiefs
People of the Province of New York
Burials in New York (state)
Columbia College (New York) alumni
18th-century deaths from tuberculosis
People from Palatine, New York
Tuberculosis deaths in New York (state)